Beikhokhei Beingaichho (born 15 August 1990) is an Indian footballer who plays primarily as a right winger for Minerva Punjab in the I-League.

Career

Early career
Born in Siaha, Mizoram, Beingaichho won the Indian Football Association (West Bengal) U-19 Player of the Year on 12 November 2009 while playing for George Telegraph. After winning the award, Beingaichho signed for East Bengal F.C. of the I-League. He scored his first goal for East Bengal in the AFC Cup on 20 April 2010 against Al-Ittihad in which he scored in the 85th minute as East Bengal lost the match 2–1. He then scored his first two I-League goals on 4 May 2010 against Chirag United in which he scored in both the 40th and 67th minutes of the match to help East Bengal to a 2–1 victory. 

In 2011, Beingaichho was sent on loan to United Sikkim F.C. for the 2011 I-League 2nd Division.

Bengaluru FC
After not playing at all during the 2012–13 I-League season, Beingaichho signed for new direct-entry I-League club Bengaluru FC for the 2013–14 season. He then made his debut for Bengaluru FC in the I-League against Mohun Bagan A.C. on 22 September 2013 in which he started and played 46 minutes before being replaced by Sunil Chhetri as his side went on to draw 1–1. He scored his first goal for the team on 26 November 2013 against Salgaocar in which his 57th-minute strike turned out to be the winning goal in Bengaluru FC's first ever away victory in their history.

Then, in Bengaluru FC's first ever Federation Cup match against Sporting Goa, Beingaichho scored a brace as Bengaluru FC won 5–3.

Mohun Bagan
After remaining unsigned in 2017–18 ISL Players Draft, Beingaichho signed up for I-League club Mohun Bagan A.C.

Minerva Punjab
Following a transfer to Minerva Punjab on August 13, 2019; he is gonna play in I-League in 2019-2020 season.

Career statistics

References

External links
 I-League profile

1990 births
Living people
People from Saiha
Indian footballers
East Bengal Club players
United Sikkim F.C. players
Bengaluru FC players
Association football forwards
Footballers from Mizoram
I-League players
I-League 2nd Division players
Mohun Bagan AC players
RoundGlass Punjab FC players